Fish marketing is the marketing and sale of fish products.

Live fish trade

Shrimp marketing

Fish markets

Chasse-marée

The fundamental meaning of un chasse-marée was "a wholesale fishmonger", originally on the Channel coast of France and later, on the Atlantic coast as well. He bought in the coastal ports and sold in inland markets. However, this meaning is not normally adopted into English. The name for such a trader in Britain, from 1500 to 1900 at least, was 'rippier'.

See also
 List of harvested aquatic animals by weight

Notes

References
 Young, J A and Muir, J F (2002) Handbook of Fish Biology and Fisheries, Chapter 3, Marketing fish. Blackwell Publishing. 

Fish products sales